Naked in New York is a 1993 American romantic comedy film directed by Daniel Algrant and starring Eric Stoltz, Mary-Louise Parker, Ralph Macchio, Jill Clayburgh, Tony Curtis, Timothy Dalton, and Kathleen Turner, and featuring multiple celebrity cameos, including William Styron listing all of his authored, penned and film work, Whoopi Goldberg as a bas-relief mask, and former New York Dolls singer David Johansen as a talking monkey, which were arranged by executive producer Martin Scorsese.

Plot
The film is narrated in flashback by Jake Briggs (Eric Stoltz), a young aspiring playwright, culminating in the production of one of his plays off-Broadway by agent Carl Fisher (Tony Curtis). The play is a flop, at least in part because the lead parts are given to two actors, Dana Coles and Jason Brett (Kathleen Turner and Chris Noth), who are "not right" for the roles. Along the journey, Jake reviews his relationships with girlfriend Joanne (Mary-Louise Parker), bisexual best friend Chris (Ralph Macchio), his mother Shirley (Jill Clayburgh), and his mostly absentee father Roman (Paul Guilfoyle). The film ends with Jake and Joanne going their separate ways, mostly because of competing career goals, and Jake hoping to write more plays with greater success.

Cast
 Eric Stoltz as Jake Briggs
 Mary-Louise Parker as Joanne White
 Ralph Macchio as Chris
 Jill Clayburgh as Shirley Briggs
 Tony Curtis as Carl Fisher
 Timothy Dalton as Elliot Price
 Kathleen Turner as Dana Coles
 Lynne Thigpen as Helen
 Roscoe Lee Browne as Mr. Red
 Paul Guilfoyle as Roman Briggs
 Burr Steers as Shipley
 Lisa Gay Hamilton as Marty
 Chris Noth as Jason Brett
 Whoopi Goldberg as Tragedy mask on theater wall
 Calista Flockhart and Arabella Field as Acting students
 Colleen Camp, Griffin Dunne, and Luis Guzmán as Auditioners
 David Johansen as Orangutan

As themselves
 Eric Bogosian
 Quentin Crisp
 Arthur Penn
 William Styron
 Marsha Norman
 Richard Price

Reception
On Rotten Tomatoes the film has an approval rating of 42% based on reviews from 12 critics. The New York Times called the film "a warm, seductive delight".

Year-end lists 
 7th worst – Desson Howe, The Washington Post
 Top 10 worst (not ranked) – Betsy Pickle, Knoxville News-Sentinel

References

External links
 
 
 
 

1993 films
1993 romantic comedy films
1993 LGBT-related films
American coming-of-age comedy films
American LGBT-related films
American romantic comedy films
Films about actors
Films about writers
Films directed by Daniel Algrant
Films set in New York City
Films shot in New York City
American independent films
Films scored by Angelo Badalamenti
1993 directorial debut films
1993 independent films
1990s English-language films
1990s American films